The 3232 Class, 20  locomotives designed by William Dean and built at Swindon Works for the Great Western Railway in 1892–93, were the GWR's last completely new 2-4-0 design. Their number series was 3232–3251.

Design
They resembled Dean's own 2201 Class and thus also Armstrong's 806 Class, though they had larger cylinders and a shorter wheelbase. All received Belpaire boilers in the course of the normal varied reboilerings.

Use
At the start of their careers these engines replaced their sister 2201s on Swindon-Weymouth trains, on South Wales expresses, and on fast North-to-West trains. Others were in the London and Reading areas, where others also moved when s displaced them from express working. A few went later to Machynlleth and Oswestry, where the last survivor was withdrawn in 1930.

References

3232
2-4-0 locomotives
Standard gauge steam locomotives of Great Britain
Railway locomotives introduced in 1892
Scrapped locomotives
Passenger locomotives